Armand Oné (born 15 March 1983) is a French former professional footballer. Oné represented clubs in Scotland, France, England, Finland and Wales.

Career
Oné played for Nantes, and after a one-month trial in Manchester United, he wasn't signed and then join Cambridge United, Northampton Town (loan, scoring once against Colchester United), Wrexham, Tamworth, Partick Thistle and Cowdenbeath (where he scored the winning goal to secure the league championship in a 2–1 victory over Elgin City) before joining Raith Rovers in the summer of 2006 for one year. In late-March 2007, Oné left Raith and moved to Finnish side TPS after a successful trial he made his debut for the Finland club at home in a 0–0 draw against IFK Mariehamn. He score his first goal in his second game away from home to Myllykosken Pallo in a 2–0 win, 27.05.07 One Scored 2 goals in a 5–1 win against Vaasan Palloseura at Veritas Stadion.

Oné played a trial match on 24 January 2009 for Livingston against Greenock Morton. He subsequently signed for the club on an 18-month contract on 27 January 2009.

Following Livingston's demotion to the Scottish Third Division, Oné had his contract terminated by the club on 31 August 2009. He signed for Gateshead in a four-month deal the following day. Gateshead announced on 25 November 2009 that they would release Oné after their game against Crawley Town three days later. It was announced on Stranraer's official club website on 7 January 2010 that he had recently agreed to sign for the club; the length of the deal was not disclosed.

Oné made his first appearance for Stranraer in a dramatic 5–4 away win at Montrose, scoring two goals to mark his debut for the club.

Oné left Stranraer after in the summer of 2011 after failing to respond to a contract offer from the Third Division club. A statement released to the Scottish Football League said that Oné would not be returning to the club.

On 16 June 2011 Oné joined Alloa Athletic on a 1-year contract.

Oné made his first appearance in a friendly against Falkirk FC, where he scored an own goal. On 13 August 2011 he came on as a substitute in a 2–2 draw against Clyde

Oné was released from his contract on 8 March 2012 having only scored one goal for 'The Wasps', in a game against Peterhead on 12 November 2011.

Honours

Alloa
 Scottish Third Division 2011–12

Cowdenbeath
 Scottish Third Division – 2005–06

Livingston
 Scottish Third Division – 2009–10

Personal life
Armand has two sons and a daughter, Jason, Ryan and Maya. Oné is the cousin of Grégory Tadé, who currently plays for Clyde

His son Ryan is also a footballer who played for Hamilton.

References

External links
 
 
  (Livingston stats)

1983 births
Footballers from Paris
Living people
French footballers
Association football forwards
FC Nantes players
Cambridge United F.C. players
Northampton Town F.C. players
Wrexham A.F.C. players
Tamworth F.C. players
Partick Thistle F.C. players
French expatriate footballers
Expatriate footballers in Finland
Expatriate footballers in Scotland
Expatriate footballers in Wales
Expatriate footballers in England
Cowdenbeath F.C. players
Raith Rovers F.C. players
Turun Palloseura footballers
Livingston F.C. players
Gateshead F.C. players
Veikkausliiga players
Scottish Football League players
National League (English football) players
Stranraer F.C. players
Alloa Athletic F.C. players